The 1978–79 2. Bundesliga season was the fifth season of the 2. Bundesliga, the second tier of the German football league system. It was played in two regional divisions, Nord and Süd.

Bayer Leverkusen, TSV 1860 Munich and Bayer Uerdingen were promoted to the Bundesliga while Westfalia Herne, FC St. Pauli, Wacker 04 Berlin, FC Hanau 93, FC Augsburg, KSV Baunatal and Borussia Neunkirchen were relegated to the Oberligas.

Nord 
For the 1978–79 season saw DSC Wanne-Eickel, Holstein Kiel, Viktoria Köln and Wacker 04 Berlin promoted to the 2. Bundesliga from the Oberliga and Amateurligas while FC St. Pauli had been relegated to the 2. Bundesliga Nord from the Bundesliga.

League table

Results

Top scorers 
The league's top scorers:

Süd
For the 1978–79 season saw Borussia Neunkirchen, FC Hanau 93, MTV Ingolstadt and SC Freiburg promoted to the 2. Bundesliga from the Amateurligas and 1. FC Saarbrücken and TSV 1860 Munich relegated to the 2. Bundesliga Süd from the Bundesliga.

League table

Results

Top scorers 
The league's top scorers:

Promotion play-offs
The final place in the Bundesliga was contested between the two runners-up in the Nord and Süd divisions. Bayer Uerdingen won on aggregate and were promoted to the Bundesliga.

References

External links
 2. Bundesliga 1978/1979 Nord at Weltfussball.de 
 2. Bundesliga 1978/1979 Süd at Weltfussball.de 
 1978–79 2. Bundesliga at kicker.de 

1978-79
2
German